Chángguān (长官) could refer to the following locations in China:

 Changguan, Anhui, in Linquan County
 Changguan, Hunan, in Yongshun County
 Changguan, Shandong, in Ningjin County